Björn Hübner (also spelled Bjoern Huebner; born 2 January 1986) is a German sabre fencer. He competed in the men's team sabre competition at the 2012 Summer Olympics.

References

External links 
 
 
 

1986 births
Living people
German male fencers
German sabre fencers
Olympic fencers of Germany
Fencers at the 2012 Summer Olympics
People from Tauberbischofsheim
Sportspeople from Stuttgart (region)
Fencers at the 2015 European Games
European Games medalists in fencing
European Games bronze medalists for Germany
20th-century German people
21st-century German people